Hispanic rhythmic, also known as Hispanic urban or "Hurban", is an American radio and format genre that features a Spanish-language musical mix of Latin hip-hop, Latin trap, reggaeton, dancehall, Latin pop, dance, tropical and salsa hits, all geared towards a bilingual audience, most of them being third-generation Hispanics. Most Hispanic rhythmics also incorporate English-language R&B/hip-hop product onto their playlists, and uses English-speaking or bilingual DJs to present and play the music on their stations that programs the format.

Radio formats